Austria-China relations, also known as Austro-Chinese or Sino-Austrian relations, are the bilateral relations between Austria and China. Austria holds an embassy in Beijing, and China holds an embassy in Vienna. Austria officially recognized the People's Republic of China on 28 May 1971.

History 
Austria-Hungary was a part of the Eight-Nation Alliance which put down the Boxer Rebellion, and as a signatory of the Boxer Protocol gained a concession in Tianjin alongside the other members of the alliance. The concession would be regained by China with the dissolution of Austria-Hungary in World War I.

Belt and Road Initiative 
In April 2018, Austria and China signed an agreement to advance cooperation, and for Austria to join the Belt and Road Initiative.

See also
 Foreign relations of Austria 
 Foreign relations of China
 China–European Union relations

References 

 
 
Bilateral relations of China
China